Lago dell'Ancipa is a reservoir in the Province of Enna and the Province of Messina, Sicily, Italy. At an elevation of 944 m, its surface area is 1.39 km².

Lakes of Sicily